Khambhat railway station is a railway station on the Western Railway network in the state of Gujarat, India. DEMU trains start from Khambhat  railway station.

Six trains pass Khambhat station most days of the week.

References

See also
 Anand district

Railway stations in Anand district
Vadodara railway division